Boujeloud is a CD by the Moroccan Sufi musicians Master Musicians of Joujouka.

Album details
It was released in September 2006 on Sub Rosa Records. It was produced by Frank Rynne under the direction of Mohamed Hamri. The group on this CD includes veteran Joujouka musician Mujehid Mujdoubi (1893–1997). The Cd records the music of Boujeloud or Pan, the ancient deity still recognised in the small Moroccan village of Jajouka or Joujouka.

Track listing
1. Boujeloud Al Boudadi 07.42
2. Boujeloud - (featuring Mujehid Mujdoubi). 04.30
3. Boujeloud / Joujouka Ei Calihoun Boujeloud / Joujouka Black Eyes. 04.30
4. Mali Mal Hal M'Halmaz Everyone is Together 05.48
5. Boujeloud Solo Drums 00.59
6. Boujeloud 09.06
7. Allah A Mohamed El Hub Tenani Allah And Mohamed - Kiss My Heart 03.23
8. Boujeloud 05.34
9. Joujouka Ei Calihoun / T`werkia D`Boujeloudia: Aishi H`liba Bab Dar Joujouka Black Eyes / Boujeloud / Wait While I Open The :Door Of The House 03.20
10. Jewash Halal / Tweka Miserisa 03.51

Musician credits
 Ahmed El Attar drum and vocal
 Mohamed El Attar lira and rhiata and vocals
 Mustapha El Attar drum
 Ahmed Bouhsini rhiata lira
 Abdelslam Boukhzar drum vocal
 Abdelslam Errtoubi rhiata and lira
 Mujehid Mujdoubi lira
 Muinier Mujdoubi drum
 Muckthar Jagdhal drum and vocal
 Mohamed Mokhchan rhiata and lira
 Abdelslam Dahnoun drum, rhiata, lira
 El Hadj clapping and vocal
 Si Ahmed violin

Catalogue number
SR243

References

External links
 Master Musicians of Joujouka Website and Ethical Store
 Review of "Boujeloud" on Dusted.com
  An interview with Frank Rynne talking about more than 15 years working with, managing and recording The Master Musicians of Joujouka. The Lazarus Corporation (UK, Nov. 2007).
 
  "The Master Musicians of Joujouka: Boujeloud". Pop Matters. Sole, Deanne (November 19, 2006). Retrieved Dec. 18, 2007

Master Musicians of Joujouka albums
Sufi music albums
Trance albums
2006 albums